Jiaoran (730–799), also known by his courtesy name Qingzhou, was a Tang dynasty Chinese poet and Buddhist monk. Jiaoran has written more than 470 poems and was one of the three major Tang dynasty poet-monks, along with Guanxiu (832–912) and Qiji (863–937). He was the 12th generation grandson of Xie An (320–385), a Jin dynasty (266–420) statesman who, despite his lack of military ability, led Jin through a major crisis—attacks by Former Qin (351–394). His friend, Lu Yu, is venerated as the Sage of Tea for his contribution to Chinese tea culture and the writer of The Classic of Tea.

Biography
Jiaoran was born in 730 in Wuxing District of Huzhou city, Zhejiang province. During the An Lushan Rebellion (755–763), he dwelt in seclusion and studied Taoism. When he was about forty, the Yuan-Chao Rebellion broken broke out. He received ordination as a monk in Tianzhou Temple in Hangzhou, in 767, the 2nd year of the Dali period (766–779) of the Tang dynasty (618–907). He studied Risshū school at first and then converted to Chan Buddhism. He was the abbot of Miaoxi Temple.

Works
 Shishi

References

External links

730 births
799 deaths
Tang dynasty poets
Chan Buddhist monks
Zen Buddhism writers
Chinese Zen Buddhists
Writers from Huzhou
Chinese spiritual writers
Tang dynasty Buddhist monks
8th-century Chinese poets
Poets from Zhejiang